Gunslinger usually refers to the Old West profession.

Gunslinger may also refer to:

People
 "The Gunslinger", nickname for American football player Brett Favre

Art, entertainment, and media

Film

 Gunslinger (film), a 1956 Western film

Games
 Call of Juarez: Gunslinger, a 2013 videogame set in the American Old West

Literature
 "Gunslinger" (poem), a 1968 poem by Ed Dorn
 The Dark Tower: The Gunslinger, a 1982 Stephen King book
 "The Gunslinger" (novella), a novella by Stephen King

Music
 "Gunslinger", an Avenged Sevenfold song off the album Avenged Sevenfold
 "Gunslinger" (John Fogerty song), on the 2007 album Revival
 Gunslinger (album), a 2016 album by country music singer Garth Brooks

Television
 Gunslinger (TV series), a 1961 CBS western television series starring Tony Young
 Gunslingers, a U.S. TV series on the American Heroes Channel
 Chapter 5: The Gunslinger, the fifth episode of The Mandalorian

Sports
 San Antonio Gunslingers, a former United States Football League team (1984–1985)
San Antonio Gunslingers (indoor football), an arena football team in the National Arena League.

See also
 Gunfighter (disambiguation)
 Gunslinger Stratos, a video game